The  is a  novel series written by Shinobu Gotoh. First published in 1992, the series received several manga, film, and stage play adaptations.

Plot

Takumi Hayama is a high school student at Shidō Academy, a private elite boarding school in the mountains. Unlike the other students, Takumi is not from a prestigious background and attends the school to escape from a past psychological trauma that leaves him repulsed by people touching him, and as a result, he is perceived as emotionless and unsociable by his classmates. The only person who doesn't see him as such, besides his roommate, is Giichi "Gui" Saki, is a popular, attractive boy who has returned from the United States. As Takumi and Gui begin their second year at the school, one day, Gui surprises Takumi by confessing that he has been in love with him for some time. As Takumi learns more about Gui, he also must learn to overcome his past and rivals who threaten to break up their newfound relationship.

Characters

Takumi is a second-year student. He is seen by his classmates as unapproachable and unsociable due to his indifferent nature. However, Takumi fears getting close to other people after his family blamed him for making advances on his older brother, when in reality, his brother had been grooming and sexually abusing him since elementary school. After meeting Gui, Takumi confronts his past and open towards other people.

Nicknamed , he is Takumi's classmate. Gui is a quarter-French and spent his childhood growing up in the United States. Gui is one of the most popular boys in school due to his friendly nature and unique beauty.

Akaike is Gui's friend and part of the student discipline committee. The student body is intimidated by him, and he initially antagonizes Takumi at first due to Takumi not taking Gui's feelings seriously. Since his mother died when he was young, he grew up doing household chores for his father. He is the only character in the series who identifies as straight and his childhood friend Mamiko is in love with him.

Misu is a popular student, but is overwhelmed by his popularity that it causes him to be stressed, which he often takes out on Shingyōji. The two eventually date.

Shingyōji is a calm boy from the kendo club.

Toshihisa was Takumi's roommate during their first year.

Iwashita is Toshihisa's new roommate beginning their second year, and they eventually begin dating.

Izumi is Shidō Academy's "princess", known for his androgynous good looks and spoiled behavior. He is in love with Gui and targets Takumi after discovering Gui's feelings for him. Eventually, he comes to accept Yoshizawa's feelings for him instead.

Yoshizawa is Izumi's good-natured roommate, who is in love with him.

Yagura is a student who fell in love with Yatsu during their school entrance exams.

Yatsu is a popular student and is slow to trust others after being betrayed. He eventually begins dating Yagura.

Nozawa is a gentle boy who is unable to refuse requests.

Komazawa falls in love with Nozawa during their first year.

Media

Novels

Shinobu Gotoh published the Takumi-kun series from 1992 to 2016, which were published by Kadokawa Shoten under the Kadokawa Ruby Bunko imprint. The novels were all illustrated by Kazumi Ohya.

Volumes

Omnibus

In 2016, Kadokawa published omnibus editions of all the novels in  format, which also included new unpublished stories. The 11th volume of the omnibus edition came with a drama CD.

Manga

Several manga adaptations have been serialized in the magazine Ciel. The first manga series, which adapted the novel Soshite Harukaze ni Sasayaite, was illustrated by Billy Takahashi and published in August 1998. The manga adaptations were then subsequently illustrated by Kazumi Ohya, the original illustrator for the novels, which were published under the Asuka Comics CL-DX imprint. The first three volumes of Ohya's manga adaptation were licensed for English distribution by Tokyopop under their Blu imprint.

Films

In 2007, Soshite Harukaze ni Sasayaite was adapted into a live-action film, starring Tomo Yanagishita as Takumi and Keisuke Katō as Gui. Following the film's release, four more adaptations were produced, with Kyousuke Hamao as Takumi and Daisuke Watanabe as Gui. After the release of the fifth film, Ano, Hareta Aozora, Hamao and Watanabe announced they were leaving the project and would not be reprising their roles for any future sequels.

In January 2023, a new film adaptation titled Takumi-kun Series: Nagai Nagai Monogatari no Hajimari no Asa was announced for release later in the year to celebrate the 30th anniversary of the series.

 Takumi-kun Series: Soshite Harukaze ni Sasayaite (2007)
 Takumi-kun Series: Niji-iro no Glass (2009)
 Takumi-kun Series: Bibō no Detail (2010)
 Takumi-kun Series: Pure (2010)
 Takumi-kun Series: Ano, Hareta Aozora (2011)
 Takumi-kun Series: Nagai Nagai Monogatari no Hajimari no Asa (2023)

Stage play

A stage play adaptation of Soshite Harukaze ni Sasayaite ran in December 2009. The DVD was released on April 16, 2010.

Reception

The novel series was successful during its run, becoming one of the most popular  novels. In 2007, the novel series had sold a cumulative total of 4 million copies. By 2016, the novels had sold a cumulative total of 5 million copies.

References

External links 
  

Books adapted into plays
Japanese novels adapted into films
Japanese radio dramas
LGBT in anime and manga
Yaoi anime and manga
Yaoi light novels
1990s LGBT novels